The Alaska Department of Public Safety is a law enforcement agency with its usual focus being the protection of life, property and wildlife resources in the state of Alaska in the United States.

The Alaska Department of Public Safety is under the direction of Commissioner James Cockrell.

Alaska DPS personnel enforce laws related to criminal statutes, traffic, wildlife, and fire. The Alaska DPS also performs search and rescue, court services and maintains criminal justice records.

Divisions
DPS has five divisions:
 Division of Administrative Services
 Division of Alaska State Troopers
 Division of Fire and Life Safety
 Division of Statewide Services
 Division of Alaska Wildlife Troopers

DPS also administers:
 the Alaska Police Standards Council
 the Alaska Fire Standards Council
 the Council on Domestic Violence and Sexual Assault
 the Alaska Scientific Crime Detection Laboratory

Unique feature
Unlike DPS agencies in many other states, due to the vast area of Alaska and limited local enforcement agencies, Alaska's DPS is the primary law enforcement and public safety organization for most of the state. The men and women of DPS provide service in conditions not usually found in many other parts of the country.

Fallen Officers
There have been 16 Alaska State Troopers, 1 Court Services Officer, and 2 K9s killed since its beginning in 1948.

See also
 Sex Offender/Child Kidnapper Registry
 
 List of law enforcement agencies in Alaska

External links
 Alaska Department of Public Safety
 Alaska State Troopers
 Fraternal Order of Alaska State Troopers
 Alaska State Troopers Museum at ExploreNorth (with photographs)
 Alaska State Troopers on National Geographic Channel (with video)

State law enforcement agencies of Alaska
Public Safety